Jan Habdas (born 2 December 2003) is a Polish ski jumper, a member of Polish ski jumping national team, a 2023 Junior World Vice-Champion in team.

World Cup

Season standings

Individual starts

References 

2003 births
Living people
People from Bielsko-Biała
Sportspeople from Silesian Voivodeship
Polish male ski jumpers